KDXT (97.9 FM, "The Ranch") is a radio station licensed to serve Lolo, Montana.  The station is licensed to Western Rockies Radio, Inc. It airs a country music format.

The station was assigned the KDXT call letters by the Federal Communications Commission on July 5, 2006.

On May 10, 2011, KDXT changed their format from classic rock to country, branded as "The Ranch".
It was noted that the KDXT call letters formerly belonged to a CHR station in Missoula at 93.3.  XT 93 as it then called was the "music FM"  It operated as the main CHR station in Missoula before becoming KGGL in 1996, also playing country music.

HD Radio
KDXT airs an adult contemporary format on its HD2 subchannel, branded as "95.3 Star FM" (simulcast on translator K237DZ 95.3 Missoula) and a classic hits format on its HD3 subchannel, branded as "94.3 The Ride" (simulcast on translator K232CI 94.3 Missoula).

Translators
KDXT also broadcasts on the following translators:

Previous logo

References

External links
KDXT official website
Mountain Broadcasting

DXT
Missoula County, Montana
Country radio stations in the United States
Radio stations established in 1996